Khomajin (also Romanized as Khomājīn; also known as Khumāin) is a village in Mofatteh Rural District, in the Central District of Famenin County, Hamadan Province, Iran. At the 2006 census, its population was 166, in 35 families.

References 

Populated places in Famenin County